Christina Anderson may refer to:
 Christina Anderson (playwright), American playwright and educator

See also
 Emanuel and Christina Anderson House, Gresham, Oregon
 Christine Anderson, German politician